ZipBooks is free online accounting software company based in American Fork, Utah. The cloud-based software is an accounting and bookkeeping tool that helps business owners process credit cards, track finances, and send invoices, among other features.

History

ZipBooks was founded by Tim Chaves in June 2015, backed by venture capital firm Peak Ventures. The company secured an additional $2 million of funding in July 2016, and in 2017 it was awarded a $100,000 economic grant by the Utah Governor's Office of Economic Development Technology Commercialization and Innovation Program.

Products

ZipBooks' core modules are invoicing, transactions, bills, reporting, time tracking, contacts, and payroll. Accrual accounting was added in 2017.

The application is available on G Suite, iOS, Slack, and as a web application.

Reception
Computerworld compared ZipBooks favorably with other accounting software. PC Magazine praised its user experience, but stated it lacked "a lot of features that competing sites offer".

See also
 Comparison of accounting software
 Double-entry bookkeeping system
 Software as a service
 Time tracking software
 Web application

References 

Accounting software
Cloud applications
Cross-platform software
Proprietary software
Software companies based in Utah
Software companies established in 2015
Time-tracking software
Web applications
Software companies of the United States
2017 establishments in Utah